Rory Jones (born 1955) is a former South African Soccer player. He was a professional soccer player for Berea Park 1973 and 1974, and Highlands Park 1975 and 1976 in the National Football League. In 1977, he joined Pretoria (Bantu) Callies in the newly formed multi-racial National Professional Soccer League and one of the first "White" players to sign for and play for a "Black" team at The Super Stadium, ( now named after his teammate, Macro "Masterpieces" Moripe ) in Attridgeville Township, west of Pretoria. He was also known as "Sikiza", someone with exceptional talent who could dribble the ball past all his opponents. He spent 6 weeks training and playing in the United Kingdom with Wolverhampton Wanderers, Arsenal and Chelsea in 1971. Described by Highlands Park Manager, Joe Frickleton, as the best left wing in South Africa. He was named in the South African National Team in 1978 vs Rhodesia, by Joe Frickleton.

See also
Football in South Africa
List of football clubs in South Africa

References

Living people
South African soccer players
1955 births
Place of birth missing (living people)
Association footballers not categorized by position
Berea Park F.C. players
Highlands Park F.C. players
Pretoria Callies F.C. players
National Football League (South Africa) players